This is a list of seasons completed by the Colorado Crush. The Crush were a professional arena football franchise of the Arena Football League (AFL), based in Denver, Colorado. The team was established in 2003. The Crush made the playoffs in every season except their inaugural year, and won two division championships. They won ArenaBowl XIX, their only appearance in the ArenaBowl. Prior to the 2009 season, the AFL announced that it had suspended operations indefinitely and canceled the  season. The Crush played their home games at the Pepsi Center.

References
General
 

Specific

Arena Football League seasons by team
 
Colorado Crush seasons